The following lists events that happened during 2015 in Niger.

Incumbents
President: Mahamadou Issoufou 
Prime Minister: Brigi Rafini

Events

January
 January 9 - Refugees flee Borno State, Nigeria, following the Boko Haram massacre in the town of Baga. 7,300 flee to neighbouring Chad while over 1,000 are trapped on the island of Kangala in Lake Chad. Nigeria's army vows to recapture the town, while Niger and Chad withdraw their forces from a transnational force tasked with combating militants.
 January 17 - Violence surrounding various protests against Charlie Hebdo leaves five protesters dead as well as some churches set ablaze in Niger.

February 
 February 9 - Boko Haram launch a raid on a prison in the town of Diffa in Niger. Authorities repel the attack.
 February 17 - A warplane bombs a funeral ceremony in Niger killing 30 civilians.

References

 
2010s in Niger
Niger
Niger
Years of the 21st century in Niger